Dili is the capital of East Timor.

Dili may also refer to:
Dili Municipality, a municipality of East Timor
Roman Catholic Diocese of Díli
Dara, a game played in Niger and Nigeria
Dili, alternative name for the Tiele people
DILI is an initialism for drug-induced liver injury